Zhou Yaohe ( May 1927 – 30 July 2018) was a Chinese materials scientist. He was elected as academician of the Chinese Academy of Science in 1991.

Born in May 1927, Zhou attended Tsinghua University. He went to the Soviet Union in 1953, and returned to China with a Candidate of Sciences degree from the Moscow Institute of Steel, in 1957. He specialized in solidification theory and technology for metal casting, and developed a new method of metal casting, which is used to produce aluminium alloy for aerospace engineering. He received the highest award of Chinese aviation industry in 1991.

He died on 30 July 2018 at Huadong Hospital in Shanghai, aged 91.

References 

1927 births
2018 deaths
Chinese materials scientists
Members of the Chinese Academy of Sciences
Academic staff of the Northwestern Polytechnical University
Scientists from Beijing
Academic staff of Shanghai Jiao Tong University
Tsinghua University alumni